Great Scott! is an album by organist Shirley Scott recorded in 1991 and released on the Muse label.

Reception
The Allmusic site awarded the album 3 stars.

Track listing 
All compositions by Shirley Scott except as indicated
 "Skylark" (Hoagy Carmichael, Johnny Mercer) - 6:56  
 "Triste" (Antônio Carlos Jobim) - 6:22  
 "More Than You Know" (Edward Eliscu, Billy Rose, Vincent Youmans) - 5:32  
 "Blues for Groove" - 5:46  
 "Have You Met Miss Jones?" (Lorenz Hart, Richard Rodgers) - 7:40  
 "I Could Have Told You" (Jimmy Van Heusen, Carl Sigman) - 6:31  
 "Don't Misunderstand" (Charles Trenet, Sigman) - 5:49  
 "Yours Is My Heart Alone" (Franz Lehár, Beda Fritz Loehner) - 7:00

Personnel 
 Shirley Scott - organ
 Buck Hill - tenor saxophone (tracks 3 & 5)
 Arthur Harper - bass 
 Mickey Roker - drums

References 

1991 albums
Muse Records albums
Shirley Scott albums